"Real Gone Kid" is a song by Scottish pop rock band Deacon Blue. Vocalist Ricky Ross wrote the song about a performance he saw of ex-Lone Justice singer Maria McKee during a time when Deacon Blue and Lone Justice toured together. The lyrics are a tribute to McKee, with the narrator using the term "real-gone kid" as a designation for craziness, referring to McKee's "wild" onstage performance style. The song was included on Deacon Blue's second studio album, When the World Knows Your Name.

Issued on 3 October 1988 as the first single from the album, the "Real Gone Kid" single features three B-sides: "Little Lincoln" and covers of Sam & Dave's "Born Again" and Hüsker Dü's "It's Not Funny Anymore". The song was the band's first top-10 hit, reaching number eight on the UK Singles Chart, number 10 in Ireland, and number five in New Zealand. In Spain, the song peaked at number one for three weeks.

Lyrical content
Lyrically, "Real Gone Kid" is a tribute to American singer-songwriter Maria McKee, inspired by the experiences that Ricky Ross went through while touring with McKee's band, Lone Justice, as their opening act. Intrigued by McKee's "wild" behavior on stage, Ross wrote the song about her, making the term "real-gone" refer to craziness. The lyrics of the track focus on the narrator's adoration of McKee. During the first verse, the narrator expresses his appreciation for McKee's older music, while the second verse and middle eight details the narrator's search for McKee keepsakes while reflecting on the way that she has improved his artistic knowledge.

Music video
The music video opens with a brief shot of the Deacon Blue logo, which moves into a line of various people against a white background  queuing up to use a photo booth. This then cuts to the band, also against a white background, playing the song. The video consists of alternating shots of photo booth usage and the band playing, featured therein are a gay kiss between two photo booth customers, a scuffle behind the photo booth curtain and Ricky Ross jumping off a Yamaha CP-70 piano. Shots of the photo booth being used by the band members are intertwined in the last shots as the song fades out.

Track listings
All songs were written by Ricky Ross except where noted.

7-inch and cassette single  
 "Real Gone Kid"
 "Little Lincoln"

Limited-edition 7-inch EP and CD single 
A1. "Real Gone Kid"
A2. "Little Lincoln"
B1. "Born Again" 
B2. "It's Not Funny Anymore" 

12-inch and mini-CD single 
A1. "Real Gone Kid" (extended version) – 7:04
B1. "Little Lincoln" – 3:05
B2. "Real Gone Kid" (seven inch version) – 4:03
 A limited-edition version also exists with a fold-out picture sleeve.

Charts

Weekly charts

Year-end charts

Certifications

In popular culture
Various mixes of the song appeared in adverts for the Boots Pharmacy in the UK from 2015 to 2017. The song was also used by boxer Paul Smith for his ring entrances, most recently against Andre Ward.

References

Deacon Blue songs
1988 singles
1988 songs
CBS Records singles
Number-one singles in Spain
Songs about musicians
Songs written by Ricky Ross (musician)